The 2018 Japan Women's Sevens was the third tournament within the 2017–18 World Rugby Women's Sevens Series and the second edition of the Japan Women's Sevens to be played in the series. It was held over the weekend of 21–22 April 2018 at Mikuni World Stadium Kitakyushu.

Format
The teams are drawn into three pools of four teams each. Each team plays every other team in their pool once. The top two teams from each pool advance to the Cup brackets while the top 2 third place teams also compete in the Cup/Plate. The other teams from each group play-off for the Challenge Trophy.

Teams
Eleven core teams are participating in the tournament along with one invited team, the runner-up of the 2017 Asia Rugby Women's Sevens Series, China:

Pool stage
All times in Japan Standard Time (UTC+09:00)

Pool A

Pool B

Pool C

Knockout stage

Challenge Trophy

5th place

Cup

Tournament placings

Source: World Rugby

Players

Scoring leaders

Source: World Rugby

Dream Team
The following seven players were selected to the tournament Dream Team at the conclusion of the tournament:

See also
 World Rugby Women's Sevens Series
 2017–18 World Rugby Women's Sevens Series

References

External links
 Tournament Page

2018
2017–18 World Rugby Women's Sevens Series
2018 in Japanese women's sport
2018 in women's rugby union
April 2018 sports events in Japan